Christian Künast (born 7 March 1971) is a German retired ice hockey player and coach, who coached the German national team at the 2019 IIHF Women's World Championship.

References

External links

1971 births
Living people
German ice hockey goaltenders
German ice hockey coaches
Sportspeople from Landshut
EV Landshut players
Starbulls Rosenheim players
ESV Kaufbeuren players
Adler Mannheim players
Hamburg Freezers players
Hannover Scorpions players
Ice hockey players at the 2002 Winter Olympics
Olympic ice hockey players of Germany